{{DISPLAYTITLE:Cav1.3}}

Calcium channel, voltage-dependent, L type, alpha 1D subunit (also known as Cav1.3) is a protein that in humans is encoded by the CACNA1D gene.  Cav1.3 channels belong to the Cav1 family, which form L-type calcium currents and are sensitive to selective inhibition by dihydropyridines (DHP).

Structure and function

Voltage-dependent calcium channels (VDCC) are selectively permeable to calcium ions, mediating the movement of these ions in and out of excitable cells. At resting potential, these channels are closed, but when the membrane potential is depolarised these channels open. The influx of calcium ions into the cell can initiate a myriad of calcium-dependent processes including muscle contraction, gene expression, and secretion. Calcium-dependent processes can be halted by lowering intracellular calcium levels, which, for example, can be accomplished by calcium pumps.

Voltage-dependent calcium channels are multi-proteins composed of α1, β, α2δ and γ subunits. The major subunit is α1, which forms the selectivity pore, voltage-sensor and gating apparatus of VDCCs. In Cav1.3 channels, the α1 subunit is α1D. This subunit differentiates Cav1.3 channels from other members of the Cav1 family, such as the predominant and better-studied Cav1.2, which has an α1C subunit. The significance of the α1 subunit also means that it is the primary target for calcium-channel blockers such as dihydropyridines. The remaining β, α2δ and γ subunits have auxiliary functions.

The α1 subunit has four homologous domains, each with six transmembrane segments. Within each homologous domain, the fourth transmembrane segment (S4) is positively charged, as opposed to the other five hydrophobic segments. This characteristic enables S4 to function as the voltage-sensor. Alpha-1D subunits belong to the Cav1 family, which is characterised by L-type calcium currents. Specifically, α1D subunits confer low-voltage activation and slowly inactivating Ca2+ currents, ideal for particular physiological functions such as neurotransmitter release in cochlea inner hair cells.

The biophysical properties of Cav1.3 channels are closely regulated by a C-terminal modulatory domain (CTM), which affects both the voltage dependence of activation and Ca2+ dependent inactivation. Cav1.3 have a low affinity for DHP and activate at sub-threshold membrane potentials, making them ideal for a role in cardiac pacemaking.

Regulation

Alternative splicing 

Post-transcriptional alternative splicing of Cav1.3 is an extensive and vital regulatory mechanism. Alternative splicing can significantly affect the gating properties of the channel. Comparable to alternative splicing of Cav1.2 transcripts, which confers functional specificity, it has recently been discovered that alternative splicing, particularly in the C-terminus, affects the pharmacological properties of Cav1.3. Strikingly, up to 8-fold differences in dihydropyridine sensitivity between alternatively spliced isoforms have been reported.

Negative feedback 

Cav1.3 channels are regulated by negative feedback to achieve Ca2+ homeostasis. Calcium ions are a critical second messenger, intrinsic to intracellular signal transduction. Extracellular calcium levels are approximated to be 12000-fold greater than intracellular levels. During calcium-dependent processes, the intracellular level of calcium rises by up to 100-fold. It is vitally important to regulate this calcium gradient, not least because high levels of calcium are toxic to the cell, and can induce apoptosis.

Ca2+-bound calmodulin (CaM) interacts with Cav1.3 to induce calcium-dependent inactivation (CDI). Recently, it has been shown that RNA editing of Cav1.3 transcripts is essential for CDI. Contrary to expectation, RNA editing does not simply attenuate the binding of CaM, but weakens the pre-binding of Ca2+-free calmodulin (apoCaM) to channels. The upshot is that CDI is continuously tuneable by changes in levels of CaM.

Clinical significance

Hearing 

Cav1.3 channels are widely expressed in humans. Notably, their expression predominates in cochlea inner hair cells (IHCs). Cav1.3  have been shown through patch clamp experiments to be essential for normal IHC development and synaptic transmission. Therefore, Cav1.3 are required for proper hearing.

Chromaffin cells 

Cav1.3 are densely expressed in chromaffin cells. The low-voltage activation and slow inactivation of these channels makes them ideal for controlling excitability in these cells. Catecholamine secretion from chromaffin cells is particularly sensitive to L-type currents, associated with Cav1.3. Catecholamines have many systemic effects on multiple organs. In addition, L-type channels are responsible for exocytosis in these cells.

Neurodegeneration 

Parkinson's disease is the second most common neurodegenerative disease, in which the death of dopamine-producing cells in the substantia nigra of the midbrain leads to impaired motor function, perhaps best characterised by tremor. Recent evidence suggests that L-type Cav1.3 Ca2+ channels contribute to the death of dopaminergic neurones in patients with Parkinson's disease. The basal activity of these neurones is also dependent on L-type Ca2+ channels, such as Cav1.3. Continuous pacemaking activity drives permanent intracellular dendritic and somatic calcium transients, which appears to make the dopaminergic substantia nigra neurones vulnerable to stressors that contribute to their death. Therefore inhibition of L-type channels, in particular Cav1.3 is protective against the pathogenesis of Parkinson's in some animal models. A clinical phase III trial (STEADY-PD III) testing this  hypothesis in patients with early Parkinsons's failed to show efficacy in slowing the progression of Parkinson's.

Inhibition of Cav1.3 can be achieved using calcium channel blockers, such as dihydropyridines (DHPs). These drugs are used since decades to treat arterial hypertension and angina. This is due to their potent vasorelaxant properties, which are mediated by the inhibition of Cav1.2 L-type calcium channels in arterial smooth muscle. Therefore, hypotensive reactions (and leg edema) are regarded dose-limiting side effects when using DHPs for inhibiting Cav1.3 channel in the brain. In the face of this issue, attempts have been made to discover selective Cav1.3 channel blockers. One candidate has been claimed to be a potent and highly selective inhibitor of Cav1.3. This compound, 1-(3-chlorophenethyl)-3-cyclopentylpyrimidine-2,4,6-(1H,3H,5H)-trione was therefore put forward as a candidate for the future treatment of Parkinson's. However, its selectivity and potency could not be confirmed in two independent studies from two other groups. One of them even reported gating changes induced by this drug., which indicate channel activating rather than blocking effects.

Prostate cancer

Recent evidence from immunostaining experiments shows that CACNA1D is highly expressed in prostate cancers compared with benign prostate tissues. Blocking L-type channels or knocking down gene expression of CACNA1D significantly suppressed cell-growth in prostate cancer cells. It is important to recognise that this association does not represent a causal link between high levels of α1D protein and prostate cancer. Further investigation is needed to explore the role of CACNA1D gene overexpression in prostate cancer cell growth.

Aldosteronism 

De novo somatic mutations in conserved regions within the channel's activation gate of its pore-forming α1-subunit (CACNA1D) cause excessive aldosterone production in aldosterone-producing adenomas (APA) resulting in primary aldosteronism, which causes treatment - resistant arterial hypertension. These mutations allow increased Ca2+ influx through Cav1.3, which in turn triggers Ca2+  - dependent aldosterone production. The number of validated APA mutations is constantly growing. In rare cases, APA mutations have also been found as germline mutations in individuals with neurodevelopmental disorders of different severity, including autism spectrum disorder.

See also 
 Calcium channel

References

Further reading

External links 
 
 

Ion channels